Boroughbridge was a parliamentary borough in Yorkshire from 1553 until 1832, when it was abolished under the Great Reform Act. Throughout its existence it was represented by two Members of Parliament in the House of Commons.

The constituency consisted of the market town of Boroughbridge in the parish of Aldborough (which was also a borough with two MPs of its own). By 1831 it contained only 154 houses, and had a population of 947.

Boroughbridge was a burgage borough, meaning that the right to vote was vested in the tenants of certain specified properties, of which there seem to have been about 65 by the time the borough was abolished. Since these properties could be freely bought and sold, the effective power of election rested with whoever owned the majority of the burgages (who, if necessary, could simply assign the tenancies to reliable placemen shortly before an election). For more than a century before the Reform Act, Boroughbridge was owned by the Dukes of Newcastle, who controlled around fifteen seats across the country; however, in the 1790s, they sold one of the seats for £4,000 to the banker Thomas Coutts, who used it to put his son-in-law, Francis Burdett, into Parliament.

Members of Parliament

Constituency created (1553)

1553–1640

1640–1832

Constituency abolished (1832)

Elections
Source: The Parliaments of England by Henry Stooks Smith (1st edition published in three volumes 1844–50), second edition edited (in one volume) by F.W.S. Craig (Political Reference Publications 1973)

Elections in the 1800s
At the 1802 general election, Edward Berkeley Portman and John Scott were elected unopposed.

At the 1806 and 1807 general elections, William Henry Clinton and Henry Dawkins were elected unopposed.

At the Boroughbridge by-election, 1808, Henry Clinton was elected unopposed.

Elections in the 1810s
At the 1812 general election, William Henry Clinton and Henry Clinton were elected unopposed.

In the Boroughbridge by-election, 1819, Marmaduke Lawson was elected unopposed.

Elections in the 1820s

Mundy and Dawkins were seated on petition.

At the 1826 United Kingdom general election, George Mundy and Henry Dawkins were elected unopposed.

Elections in the 1830s

Notes

References
Robert Beatson, "A Chronological Register of Both Houses of Parliament" (London: Longman, Hurst, Res & Orme, 1807) 
Michael Brock, The Great Reform Act (London: Hutchinson, 1973)
D. Brunton & D. H. Pennington, Members of the Long Parliament (London: George Allen & Unwin, 1954)
Cobbett's Parliamentary history of England, from the Norman Conquest in 1066 to the year 1803 (London: Thomas Hansard, 1808) 
J E Neale, The Elizabethan House of Commons (London: Jonathan Cape, 1949)
J Holladay Philbin, "Parliamentary Representation 1832 – England and Wales" (New Haven: Yale University Press, 1965)
Henry Stooks Smith, "The Parliaments of England from 1715 to 1847" (2nd edition, edited by FWS Craig – Chichester: Parliamentary Reference Publications, 1973)
Frederic A Youngs, jr, "Guide to the Local Administrative Units of England, Vol II" (London: Royal Historical Society, 1991)

Politics of the Borough of Harrogate
Parliamentary constituencies in Yorkshire and the Humber (historic)
Constituencies of the Parliament of the United Kingdom established in 1553
Constituencies of the Parliament of the United Kingdom disestablished in 1832
Rotten boroughs
Boroughbridge